Donald Herman Voet (born November 29, 1938) is an emeritus associate professor of chemistry at the University of Pennsylvania. His laboratory uses x-ray crystallography to understand structure-function relationships in proteins. He and his wife, Judith G. Voet, are authors of biochemistry text books that are widely used in undergraduate and graduate curricula.

Education
Voet earned his B.S. in chemistry from the California Institute of Technology in 1960 and his Ph.D. in chemistry from Harvard University with William N. Lipscomb, Jr. in 1967.

Career
He completed his postdoctoral research at the Massachusetts Institute of Technology in 1969 in the laboratory of Alexander Rich. He later became a professor in the chemistry department at the University of Pennsylvania. Voet and his wife are coeditors-in-chief of the journal Biochemical and Molecular Biology Education.

Notable publications
Voet, D; Voet, J.G.; and Pratt, C.W., Fundamentals of Biochemistry, Life at the molecular level (4th ed.), John Wiley & Sons (2013)
 Voet, D. and Voet, J, G., Biochemistry (4th ed.), John Wiley & Sons Inc.: Hoboken, NJ (2011)
 Voet, D; Voet, J.G.; and Pratt, C.W., Fundamentals of Biochemistry (3rd ed.), John Wiley & Sons (2008)
Uzman, A.; Eichberg, J.; Widger, W.; Cornely, K.; Voet, D.; Voet,J.G.; and Pratt, C.W.; Student Companion to Accompany Fundamentals of Biochemistry (2nd ed.), John Wiley & Sons (2006)
Voet, D; Voet, J.G.; and Pratt, C.W.; Fundamentals of Biochemistry (2nd ed.), John Wiley & Sons (2006)
Voet, D. and Voet, J. G., Solutions Manual to Accompany Biochemistry (3rd ed.), John Wiley & Sons (2004)
Voet, D. and Voet, J. G., Biochemistry (3rd ed.), John Wiley & Sons (2004)

References

Living people
American biochemists
California Institute of Technology alumni
Harvard Graduate School of Arts and Sciences alumni
University of Pennsylvania faculty
American textbook writers
American male non-fiction writers
1938 births